Huaviña is a Chilean town. The town is located in the foothills of the commune of Huara in a canyon known as Quebrada de Tarapacá. It is located 80km from the seat of the municipality and 153 kilometers from Iquique. Its ain economic activity is agriculture, in addition to raising various animals for sale.

Reference 

Populated places in Tarapacá Region